Palazzo Baldassini is a palace in Rome, Italy, designed by the Renaissance architect Antonio da Sangallo the Younger in about 1516–1519.  It was designed for the papal jurist from Naples, Melchiorre Baldassini.  The ground floor was used for shops or workshops, and the piano nobile consisted of private apartments.

The interior was frescoed by Giovanni da Udine, Perin del Vaga, Polidoro da Caravaggio and Maturino da Firenze.

Notes

Houses completed in 1519
Baldassini
Renaissance architecture in Rome
Rome R. VIII Sant'Eustachio